Itziar Gómez López (born 29 January 1965) is a Navarrese politician, Minister of Rural Development and Environment of Navarre since August 2019.

References

1965 births
Government ministers of Navarre
Geroa Bai politicians
Living people
Politicians from Navarre